Shivaharkaray or Karavipur is a Shakti Peeth dedicated to the Hindu Goddess Durga, located near Parkai railway station, near Karachi, Pakistan. It is one of the two Shakti Peethas in Pakistan, other being Hinglaj Mata mandir Puranas describe that the three eyes (the third eye) of the Goddess fell here after she committed Sati. The Goddess is worshipped as Mahishasuramardini, or the slayer of the Demon Mahishasur. Her consort, the Hindu God Shiva, is worshipped in Ragi form as Krodhish, personification of anger. Shivaharkaray is third in the list of 51 Peethas identified in the Puranas.

Legend
Sati was the first wife of Shiva and first incarnation of Parvati. She was the daughter of King Daksha and Queen (the daughter of Brahma). She was insulted and hurt by her father not inviting both her and her husband to a yagna, and so she committed self-immolation at its sacrificial fire in grief. Shiva was distraught after hearing of her death, and danced around the world in a Tandav Nritya (“devastating penance” or dance of destruction), carrying her body on his shoulders. In order to return Shiva to normalcy, Vishnu used his Sudarshan Chakra, the rotating blade on his finger tip. He dismembered the body of Sati into several pieces, and wherever a piece fell on the earth, its location was consecrated as a divine shrine, or Shakthi Peeth, with deities of Sati (Parvati) and Shiva.

These locations have become famous pilgrimage places as Pithas or Shakthi Pithas, and are scattered throughout the subcontinent, including in Pakistan, Bangladesh, Sri Lanka and Nepal, and India. Sati is also known as Devi or Shakthi. With the blessing of Vishnu she was reborn as the daughter of Himavat or Himalayas, and hence named Parvati, or daughter of mountains. She was born on the 14th day of the bright half of the month of Mrigashīrsha, which marks the Shivarathri, the night festival of Shiva.

This temple is one of the two Shakti Peethas in Pakistan, other being Hinglaj Mata mandir

See also

 Hinduism in Pakistan
 Evacuee Trust Property Board
 Hinglaj Mata
 Kalat Kali Temple
 Katasraj temple 
 Multan Sun Temple
 Prahladpuri Temple, Multan
 Sadh Belo
 Shiv Mandir, Umerkot
 Shri Varun Dev Mandir
 Tilla Jogian

References

Bibliography

Hindu temples in Sindh
Shakti Peethas
Hindu temples in Balochistan, Pakistan